James Bernard Miller (February 20, 1932 – November 1, 2006) was a Canadian football end who played six seasons with the Montreal Alouettes of the Interprovincial Rugby Football Union. He was drafted by the Montreal Alouettes in the third round of the 1953 IRFU College Draft. He played college football at McGill University.

College career
Miller played college football for the McGill Redmen from 1949 to 1953, including three seasons on the senior squad. He was an All-Star in 1952. He also won three consecutive Canadian intercollegiate boxing heavyweight championships from 1951 to 1953. Miller represented McGill at the 1952 Canadian boxing championships and Olympic trials in Vancouver. He was the 1953 Quebec Golden Gloves heavyweight champion.  He studied commerce at McGill University. Miller was inducted into the McGill Sports Hall of Fame on September 26, 2002.

Professional career

Montreal Alouettes
Miller was selected by the Montreal Alouettes with the ninth pick in the 1953 IRFU Draft and played for the team from 1953 to 1958. He earned IRFU All-Star honors at defensive end in 1956. The Alouettes lost the Grey Cup three straight years from 1954 to 1956.

Personal life
Miller managed an appliance company called Danby Corporation upon leaving McGill. He sold the company in 1972 and starting managing Miller Properties, a real estate business with properties in Quebec and the United States, in 1982. He was inducted into the YMHA Hall of Fame in October 2001.

References

External links
Just Sports Stats

1932 births
2006 deaths
Players of Canadian football from Quebec
Canadian football ends
McGill Redbirds football players
Montreal Alouettes players
Anglophone Quebec people
20th-century Canadian businesspeople
Canadian real estate businesspeople
Businesspeople from Montreal
Canadian football people from Montreal